Sonia Todd (born 1959; Adelaide) is an Australian actress. She is best known for her television roles as Sgt. Georgia Rattray in Police Rescue, Meg Fountain in McLeod's Daughters and Gina Austin in the soap opera Home and Away.

Biography 
She studied at the National Institute of Dramatic Art and starred in the play Strictly Ballroom, directed by Baz Luhrmann.   She also played the waitress, Sylvia, in the film Shine directed by Scott Hicks, in the café scene where Geoffrey Rush plays Flight of the Bumblebee by Nikolai Rimsky-Korsakov to an understandably stunned audience.

Todd is married to Rhett Walton and has two sons (born in 1992 and 2000), the first from a previous relationship.

Todd became known from the role of 'Georgia Rattray' in the television series Police Rescue, for which she won for an AFI Award in 1991. She was also nominated for an AFI Award for her role in the four-part mini-series The Potato Factory (2000).

From 2001–06, 2007, 2009 (guest), she played 'Meg Fountain' in McLeod's Daughters.

Todd held a recurring role in All Saints from late 2007 to  early 2008; she portrayed psychiatrist Dr Elizabeth Foy. She also appeared in All Saints previously, playing the part of Kate Larson

In January 2009, Todd joined the cast of Seven Network drama series Home and Away in the regular role of Gina Austin. After four years on the show, Todd decided to leave Home and Away to pursue other acting challenges. She appears in the legal drama Janet King.

Filmography

References

External links

Sonia Todd at the Home and Away official website

1959 births
AACTA Award winners
Actresses from Adelaide
Australian television actresses
Living people
Logie Award winners
National Institute of Dramatic Art alumni